Ciobalaccia is a commune in Cantemir District, Moldova. It is composed of three villages: Ciobalaccia, Flocoasa and Victorovca.

Notable people
 Sergiu Mocanu

References

Communes of Cantemir District